Baharlı, Agdam may refer to:
 Baharlı, Üçoğlan
 Baharlı, Xındırıstan
 Birinci Baharlı
 İkinci Baharlı